John Farnsworth may refer to:

 John F. Farnsworth, U.S. Representative from Illinois and general
 John Semer Farnsworth, United States Navy officer convicted of spying for Japan